Javier Orihuela García (born 23 June 1955) is a Mexican politician affiliated with the PRD. He currently serves as Deputy of the LXII Legislature of the Mexican Congress representing Morelos.

References

1955 births
Living people
Politicians from Morelos
Party of the Democratic Revolution politicians
21st-century Mexican politicians
People from Temixco
Chapingo Autonomous University alumni
Municipal presidents in Morelos
Deputies of the LXII Legislature of Mexico
Members of the Chamber of Deputies (Mexico) for Morelos